Goreyakothi  is a Bihar Legislative Assembly Constituency in Siwan district in the Indian state of Bihar. This constituency was formed in 2010 after two blocks of Basantpur constituency were merged with Goreyakothi block and a new constituency was formed. Bhumendra Narayan Singh was the first MLA of this newly formed Goriakothi assembly seat in 2010.
Satyadeo Prasad Singh was MLA from this constituency from 2015 to 2020 and Deveshkant Singh became MLA in 2020. Deveshkant Singh is the only fourth generation politician in the Bihar Vidhan sabha. His father Shri Bhumendra Narayan Singh was MLA two terms from here. His grandfather Shri Krishnakant Singh was also an MLA many times, as well as the first MLA of Goriakothi and MP of Maharajganj. Shri Krishnakant was very close to the first chief minister of Bihar, he held several ministerial posts at times such as health, education and many more. He was also the de facto chief minister in the CM tenure of Shri Bhola Paswan.
Narayan babu was a 2 time member of the central assembly that used to be in place before India was independent, was a visionary and started the first school in northern Bihar in 1916 the same day when BHU was started. All the above mentioned, KK Singh his son, BN Singh his grandson, and DK Singh his great grandson have followed his footsteps and are involved in social welfare works.
Dr Shanti Roy brought more limelight to Goriakothi as she became the first lady doctor from Goriakothi to be conferred the Padam Shree in 2019, she had got her initial education from Narayan karmyogi high school, Goriakothi. Her son Dr Himanshu Roy is a well known doctor all over Bihar.

Overview
As per Delimitation of Parliamentary and Assembly constituencies Order, 2008, No. 111 Goriakothi Assembly constituency  is composed of the following: Goriakothi, Lakri Nabiganj and Basantpur. community development blocks.

Goriakothi Assembly constituency is part of No. 19 Maharajganj (Lok Sabha constituency).

Members of Legislative Assembly

Election results

2020

References

External links
 

Assembly constituencies of Bihar
Politics of Siwan district